Nathan Jon Reardon (born 8 November 1984) is a former professional Australian cricketer. He primarily played as a batsman in limited overs matches, playing for his home state of Queensland from 2005 to 2016. He also played Twenty20 cricket in the Big Bash League for four different teams, and represented Australia in two Twenty20 Internationals in November 2014.

Cricket career

Reardon made his debut for Queensland in their opening game of the 2005–06 ING Cup on 14 October 2005. He was selected as the team's "super sub" (an experimental rule allowing a player to be substituted into the match partway through) to replace the injured Chris Simpson. He was considered an all-rounder early in his career, combining his batting with medium-pace bowling, but later on bowled less and was included in the team purely for his batting.

Across his career, Reardon experienced more success in one-day and Twenty20 matches than he did in longer first-class matches. He had his best season in the 2011–12 Ryobi One-Day Cup. He scored his maiden one-day century in a match against Western Australia on 11 February 2012. Although Queensland went on to lose the game by 5 runs, Reardon was still named the player of the match for his efforts. Reardon finished the competition with 403 runs at an average of 57.57, the second-most runs of any batter in the competition.

Reardon was included in the Australian national cricket team's squad for a Twenty20 International (T20I) series against South Africa in November 2014. This series was being played in very close proximity to a Test series in the United Arab Emirates, which made a number of Test players unavailable for the T20I series. Reardon was selected off of the back of his strong batting in the 2014–15 Matador BBQs One-Day Cup to make up for this unavailability. He made his T20I debut in the first match of the series at Adelaide Oval on 5 November. His cap was presented to him by former Australian batsman Michael Hussey. He played his second and final T20I two days later on 7 November at the Melbourne Cricket Ground, and was never selected to play for Australia again. His played his final professional cricket game for the Hobart Hurricanes in the Big Bash League in February 2018.

See also
 List of Queensland first-class cricketers
 List of Adelaide Strikers players

References

External links
 

1984 births
Living people
Australia Twenty20 International cricketers
Queensland cricketers
Australian cricketers
Melbourne Renegades cricketers
Adelaide Strikers cricketers
Cricketers from Queensland
Brisbane Heat cricketers
Hobart Hurricanes cricketers
Northern Districts cricketers